Procapperia orientalis is a moth of the family Pterophoridae. It is found in India (Kashmir) and Kyrgyzstan.

The wingspan is 14–17 mm. The forewings and hindwings are brown. Adults have been recorded in July.

References

Moths described in 1988
Oxyptilini
Moths of Asia